Gmachl is a hotel in Elixhausen, Salzburg (state). The hotel has more than 70 guest rooms, a spa area, an outdoor area for summer and winter activities, a butchery and a tennis park.

History
Gmachl was founded in 1334 making it one of the oldest companies in Austria. The business is now run by Michaela Hirnböck-Gmachl and her husband Fritz Hirnböck (23rd generation).

References

External links

Hotels in Austria
Economy of Salzburg (state)
1334 establishments in Europe